Tennessee is the thirty-fifth-richest state in the United States of America, with a per capita income of $28,764 (2017).

Tennessee counties ranked by per capita income

Note: Data is from the 2010 United States Census Data and the 2006–2010 American Community Survey 5-Year Estimates.

References

Tennessee
Locations by income
Locations by income
Income